Cnephasia albatana is a species of moth of the  family Tortricidae. It is found in Algeria.

References

Moths described in 1915
albatana